Kirkuk Olympic Stadium is a multi-use stadium in Kirkuk, Iraq.  It is currently used mostly for football matches and it also has an athletics track. The stadium holds 25,000.

The stadium was built in 1982 for an Olympics that never happened.

The stadium refurbishment is being done in two phases. First the stadium is being comprehensively rebuilt. Phase two will augment the facilities.

See also 
List of football stadiums in Iraq

References

Football venues in Iraq
Kirkuk
1982 establishments in Iraq
Sports venues completed in 1982